Old Stone Arch Bridge may refer to:

Old Stone Arch Bridge (Clark Center, Illinois)
Old Stone Arch (Marshall, Illinois), a stone arch bridge
Old Stone Arch Bridge (Bound Brook, New Jersey)
Old Stone Arch Bridge (Lewistown, Pennsylvania)